The Fly Castelluccio Diavolo  is an Italian powered parachute that was designed and produced by Fly Castelluccio Paramotor Paragliding and Trike srl of Ascoli Piceno. Now out of production, when it was available the aircraft was supplied as a complete ready-to-fly-aircraft.

The company was the leading manufacturer of paragliders and paramotors in Italy and at one time was poised to be the leading manufacturer in Europe. The Diavolo was introduced about 2004 and production ended when the company went out of business in 2007.

Design and development
The Diavolo was designed to comply with the Fédération Aéronautique Internationale microlight category and the US FAR 103 Ultralight Vehicles rules for two-seat trainers. It features a parachute-style wing, two-seats-in-tandem accommodation, tricycle landing gear and a single  Simonini Racing srl engine in pusher configuration. The fuel tank is located under the rear seat, which elevates the seat for better visibility.

The aircraft carriage is built from a combination of bolted aluminium and 4130 steel tubing. In flight steering is accomplished via foot pedals that actuate the canopy brakes, creating roll and yaw. On the ground the aircraft has lever-controlled nosewheel steering. The main landing gear incorporates spring rod suspension, with steel cable bracing.

Specifications (Diavolo)

References

External links
Official website archive on Archive.org

Diavolo
2000s Italian sport aircraft
2000s Italian ultralight aircraft
Single-engined pusher aircraft
Powered parachutes